Harvey Phillip Spector (born Harvey Philip Spector; December 26, 1939January 16, 2021) was an American record producer and songwriter, best known for his innovative recording practices and entrepreneurship in the 1960s, followed decades later by his two trials and conviction for murder in the 2000s. Spector developed the Wall of Sound, a production style that is characterized for its diffusion of tone colors and dense orchestral sound, which he described as a "Wagnerian" approach to rock and roll. He is widely regarded as one of the most influential figures in pop music history and one of the most successful producers of the 1960s.

Born in the Bronx, Spector moved to Los Angeles as a teenager and began his career in 1958 as a founding member of the Teddy Bears, for whom he penned "To Know Him Is to Love Him", a U.S. number-one hit. In 1960, after working as an apprentice to Leiber and Stoller, Spector co-founded Philles Records, and at the age of 21 became the youngest ever U.S. label owner to that point. Dubbed the "First Tycoon of Teen", Spector came to be considered the first auteur of the music industry for the unprecedented control he had over every phase of the recording process. He produced acts such as the Ronettes, the Crystals, and Ike & Tina Turner, and typically collaborated with arranger Jack Nitzsche and engineer Larry Levine. The musicians from his de facto house band, later known as "the Wrecking Crew", rose to industry fame through his hit records.

In the early 1970s, Spector produced the Beatles' Let It Be and several solo records by John Lennon and George Harrison. By the mid-1970s Spector had produced eighteen U.S. Top 10 singles for various artists. His chart-toppers included the Righteous Brothers' "You've Lost That Lovin' Feelin'", the Beatles' "The Long and Winding Road", and Harrison's "My Sweet Lord". Following one-off productions for Leonard Cohen (Death of a Ladies' Man), Dion DiMucci (Born to Be with You), and the Ramones (End of the Century), Spector remained largely inactive amid a lifestyle of seclusion, drug use, and increasingly erratic behavior.

Spector helped establish the role of the studio as an instrument, the integration of pop art aesthetics into music (art pop), and the genres of art rock and dream pop. His honors include the 1973 Grammy Award for Album of the Year for co-producing Harrison's Concert for Bangladesh, a 1989 induction into the Rock and Roll Hall of Fame, and a 1997 induction into the Songwriters Hall of Fame. In 2004, Spector was ranked number 63 on Rolling Stones list of the greatest artists in history. In 2009, after spending three decades in semi-retirement, he was convicted for the 2003 murder of the actress Lana Clarkson and sentenced to 19 years to life in prison. He died in prison in 2021.

Biography

1939–1959: Background and the Teddy Bears
Harvey  Spector was born on December 26, 1939. He later added a second "l" to his middle name, which he preferred over "Harvey". His parents were Benjamin (1903–1949) and Bertha (1911–1995) Spector, a first-generation immigrant Russian-Jewish family in the Bronx, New York City. Bertha had been born in France to Russian migrants George and Clara Spektor, who brought her to America in 1911 aged 9 months, while Benjamin was born as Baruch (later changed to Benjamin) in the Russian Empire to George and Bessie Spektus or Spektres, and brought to America by his parents in 1913 aged 10. Both families anglicized their last names to "Spector" on their naturalization papers, both of which were witnessed by the same man, Isidore Spector. The similarities in name and background of the grandfathers led Spector to believe that his parents were first cousins. He had a sister named Shirley, who was six years his senior; she died in 2004 in Hemet, California, at the age of 70.

In April 1949, Spector's father, who was deeply in debt, committed suicide; on his gravestone were inscribed the words "Ben Spector. Father. Husband. To Know Him Was To Love Him". In 1953, Spector's mother moved the family to Los Angeles where she found work as a seamstress. Spector attended John Burroughs Junior High School (now John Burroughs Middle School) on Wilshire Boulevard, then in 1954 transferred to Fairfax High School. Having learned to play guitar, Spector performed "Rock Island Line" in a talent show at Fairfax High. He joined a loose-knit community of aspiring musicians, including Lou Adler, Bruce Johnston, Steve Douglas, and Sandy Nelson. Spector formed a group, the Teddy Bears, with Nelson and two other friends, Marshall Leib and Annette Kleinbard.

During this period, record producer Stan Ross—co-owner of Gold Star Studios in Hollywood—began to tutor Spector in record production and exerted a major influence on Spector's production style. In 1958, the Teddy Bears recorded the Spector-penned "Don't You Worry My Little Pet", and then signed a two to three singles recording deal with Era Records, with the promise of more if the singles did well.

At their next session, they recorded another song Spector had written—this one inspired by the epitaph on Spector's father's tombstone. Released on Era's subsidiary label, Dore Records, "To Know Him Is to Love Him" reached number one on Billboard Hot 100 singles chart on December 1, 1958, selling over a million copies by year's end. Following the success of their debut, the group signed with Imperial Records. Their next single, "I Don't Need You Anymore", reached number 91. They released several more recordings, including an album, The Teddy Bears Sing!, but failed to reach the top 100 in US sales. The group disbanded in 1959.

1959–1962: Early production work, Philles Records, and the Crystals 

While recording the Teddy Bears' album, Spector met Lester Sill, a former promotion man who was a mentor to Jerry Leiber and Mike Stoller. Sill and his partner, Lee Hazlewood supported Spector's next project, the Spectors Three. In 1960, Sill arranged for Spector to work as an apprentice to Leiber and Stoller in New York. Spector co-wrote the Ben E. King Top 10 hit "Spanish Harlem" with Leiber and also worked as a session musician, playing the guitar solo on the Drifters' song "On Broadway".

Spector's first true recording artist and project as producer was Ronnie Crawford. Spector's production work during this time included releases by LaVern Baker, Ruth Brown, and Billy Storm, as well as the Top Notes' original recording of "Twist and Shout". Leiber and Stoller recommended Spector to produce Ray Peterson's "Corrine, Corrina", which reached number 9 in January 1961. Later, he produced another major hit for Curtis Lee, "Pretty Little Angel Eyes", which made it to number 7. Returning to Hollywood, Spector agreed to produce one of Sill's acts. After both Liberty Records and Capitol Records turned down the master of "Be My Boy" by the Paris Sisters, Sill formed a new label, Gregmark Records, with Lee Hazlewood, and released it. It reached only number 56, but the follow-up, "I Love How You Love Me", was a hit, reaching number 5.

In late 1961, Spector formed a record company with Sill, who by this time had ended his business partnership with Hazlewood. Philles Records combined the first names of its two founders. Through Hill and Range Publishers, Spector found three groups he wanted to produce: the Ducanes, the Creations, and the Crystals. The first two signed with other companies, but Spector managed to secure the Crystals for his new label. Their first single, "There's No Other (Like My Baby)" was a success, hitting number 20. Their next release, "Uptown", made it to number 13.

Spector continued to work freelance with other artists. In 1962, he produced "Second Hand Love" by Connie Francis, which reached No. 7. Ahmet Ertegun of Atlantic paired Spector with future Broadway star Jean DuShon for "Talk to Me", the B-side of which was "Tired of Trying", written by DuShon.

1962–1965: Bob B. Soxx & the Blue Jeans, the Ronettes, and the Righteous Brothers 
In 1962, Spector briefly took a job as an A&R producer for Liberty Records. It was while working at Liberty that he heard a song written by Gene Pitney, for whom he had produced a number 41 hit, "Every Breath I Take", a year earlier. "He's a Rebel" was due to be released on Liberty by Vikki Carr, but Spector rushed into Gold Star Studios and recorded a cover version using Darlene Love and the Blossoms on lead vocals. The record was released on Philles, attributed to the Crystals, and quickly rose to the top of the charts.

By the time "He's a Rebel" went to number 1, Lester Sill was out of the company, and Spector had Philles all to himself. He created a new act, Bob B. Soxx & the Blue Jeans, featuring Darlene Love, Fanita James (a member of the Blossoms), and Bobby Sheen, a singer he had worked with at Liberty. The group had hits with "Zip-a-Dee-Doo-Dah" (number 8), "Why Do Lovers Break Each Other's Heart" (number 38), and "Not Too Young to Get Married" (number 63). Spector also released solo material by Darlene Love in 1963. In the same year, he released "Be My Baby" by the Ronettes, which went to number 2.

The first time Spector put the same amount of effort into an LP as he did into 45s was when he utilized the full Philles roster and the Wrecking Crew to make what he felt would become a hit for the 1963 Christmas season. A Christmas Gift for You from Philles Records was released a few days after the assassination of President Kennedy in November 1963.

On September 28, 1963, the Ronettes appeared at the Cow Palace, near San Francisco. Also on the bill were the Righteous Brothers. Spector, who was conducting the band for all the acts, was so impressed with Bill Medley and Bobby Hatfield that he bought their contract from Moonglow Records and signed them to Philles. In early 1965, "You've Lost That Lovin' Feelin'" became the label's second number 1 single. Three more major hits with the duo followed: "Just Once in My Life" (number 9), "Unchained Melody" (number 4, originally the B-side of "Hung on You"), and "Ebb Tide" (number 5). Despite having hits, he lost interest in producing the Righteous Brothers and sold their contract and all their master recordings to Verve Records. However, the sound of the Righteous Brothers' singles was so distinctive that the act chose to replicate it after leaving Spector, notching a second number 1 hit in 1966 with the Bill Medley–produced "(You're My) Soul and Inspiration".

During this period, Spector formed another subsidiary label, Phi-Dan Records, partly created to keep promoter Danny Davis occupied. The label released singles by artists including Betty Willis, the Lovelites, and the Ikettes. None of the recordings on Phi-Dan were produced by Spector.

The recording of "Unchained Melody", credited on some releases as a Spector production although Medley has consistently said he produced it originally as an album track, had a second wave of popularity 25 years after its initial release, when it was featured prominently in the 1990 hit movie Ghost. A re-release of the single re-charted on the Billboard Hot 100, and went to number one on the Adult Contemporary charts. This also put Spector back on the U.S. Top 40 charts for the first time since his last appearance in 1971 with John Lennon's "Imagine", though he did have UK top 40 hits in the interim with the Ramones.

1966–1969: Ike & Tina Turner and hiatus 

Spector's final signing to Philles was the husband-and-wife team of Ike & Tina Turner in April 1966. Spector considered their single "River Deep – Mountain High" his best work, but it failed to reach any higher than number 88 in the United States. The record, which actually featured Tina Turner without Ike Turner, was successful in Britain, reaching number 3.

Spector released another single by Ike & Tina Turner, "I'll Never Need More Than This", while negotiating a deal to move Philles to A&M Records in 1967. The deal did not materialize, and Spector subsequently lost enthusiasm for his label and the recording industry. Already something of a recluse, he withdrew temporarily from the public eye, marrying Veronica "Ronnie" Bennett, lead singer of the Ronettes, in 1968. Spector emerged briefly for a cameo as himself in an episode of I Dream of Jeannie (1967) and as a drug dealer in the film Easy Rider (1969).

In 1969, Spector made a brief return to the music business by signing a production deal with A&M Records. A Ronettes single, "You Came, You Saw, You Conquered" flopped, but Spector returned to the Hot 100 with "Black Pearl", by Sonny Charles and the Checkmates, Ltd., which reached number 13.

1970–1973: Comeback and Beatles collaborations 
In early 1970, Allen Klein, the new manager of the Beatles, brought Spector to England. After impressing with his production of John Lennon's solo single "Instant Karma!", which went to number 3, Spector was invited by Lennon and George Harrison to take on the task of turning the Beatles' abandoned Let It Be recording sessions into a usable album. He went to work using many of his production techniques, making significant changes to the arrangements and sound of some songs. Released a month after the Beatles' break-up, the album topped the U.S. and UK charts. It also yielded the number 1 U.S. single "The Long and Winding Road". Spector's overdubbing of "The Long and Winding Road" infuriated its composer, Paul McCartney. Several music critics also maligned Spector's work on Let It Be; he later attributed this partly to resentment that an American producer appeared to be "taking over" such a popular English band. Lennon defended Spector, telling Jann Wenner of Rolling Stone: "he was given the shittiest load of badly recorded shit, with a lousy feeling toward it, ever. And he made something out of it. He did a great job."

For Harrison's multiplatinum album All Things Must Pass (number 1, 1970), Spector helped provide a symphonic ambience, although his health issues meant that after recording the basic tracks, he was absent from the project until the mixing stage. Rolling Stones reviewer lauded the album's sound, calling it "Wagnerian, Brucknerian, the music of mountain tops and vast horizons". The triple LP yielded two major hits: "My Sweet Lord" (number 1) and "What Is Life" (number 10). That same year, Spector co-produced Lennon's Plastic Ono Band (number 6), a stark-sounding album devoid of any Wall of Sound extravagance. Through Harrison, he also produced the debut single by Derek and the Dominos, "Tell the Truth", but the band disliked the sound and had the record withdrawn.

Spector was made head of A&R for Apple Records. He held the post for only a year, during which he co-produced Lennon's 1971 single "Power to the People" (number 11) and his chart-topping album Imagine. The album's title track hit number 3. With Harrison, Spector co-produced Harrison's "Bangla Desh" (number 23)—rock's first charity single—and wife Ronnie Spector's "Try Some, Buy Some" (number 77). The latter was recorded for Ronnie's intended solo album on Apple Records, a project that stalled due to the same erratic, alcohol-fueled behavior from Spector that had hindered work on All Things Must Pass. Spector was convinced that the Harrison-written single would be a major hit, and its poor commercial performance was one of the biggest disappointments of his career.

That same year Spector oversaw the live recording of the Harrison-organized Concert for Bangladesh shows in New York City, which resulted in the number 1 triple album The Concert for Bangladesh. The album won the "Album of the Year" award at the 1973 Grammys. Despite being recorded live, Spector used up to 44 microphones simultaneously to create his trademark Wall of Sound. Following Harrison's death in 2001, Spector said that the most creative period of his career was when he worked with Lennon and Harrison in the early 1970s, and he believed that this was true of Lennon and Harrison also, despite their achievements with the Beatles.

Lennon retained Spector for the 1971 Christmas single "Happy Xmas (War Is Over)" and the poorly reviewed 1972 album Some Time in New York City (number 48), both collaborations with Yoko Ono. In late 1972, Apple reissued Spector's A Christmas Gift for You from Philles Records (as Phil Spector's Christmas Album), bringing the recordings the commercial success and critical recognition that had originally eluded the 1963 release. Lennon and Ono's "Happy Xmas" single similarly stalled in sales upon its initial release, but later became a fixture on radio station playlists around Christmas.

Harrison and Spector started work on Harrison's Living in the Material World album in October 1972, but Spector's unreliability soon led to Harrison dismissing him from the project. Harrison recalled having to climb down into Spector's central London hotel room from the roof to get him to attend the sessions, and that his co-producer would then need "eighteen cherry brandies before he could get himself down to the studio".

In late 1973, Spector produced the initial recording sessions for what became Lennon's 1975 covers album Rock 'n' Roll (number 6). The sessions were held in Los Angeles, with Lennon allowing Spector free rein as producer for the first time, but were characterized by substance abuse and chaotic arrangements. Amid the party atmosphere, Spector brandished his handguns and at one point fired a shot while Lennon was recording. In December, Lennon and Spector abandoned the collaboration. Since the studio time had been booked by his production company, Spector withheld the tapes until June the following year, when Lennon reimbursed him through Capitol Records.

1974–1980: Near-fatal accident, Warner-Spector Records, Leonard Cohen, and the Ramones 

As the 1970s progressed, Spector became increasingly reclusive. The most probable and significant reason for his withdrawal, according to biographer Dave Thompson, was that in 1974 he was seriously injured when he was thrown through the windshield of his car in a crash in Hollywood. Spector was almost killed, and it was only because the attending police officer detected a faint pulse that Spector was not declared dead at the scene. He was admitted to the UCLA Medical Center on the night of March 31, suffering serious head injuries that required several hours of surgery, with over 300 stitches to his face and more than 400 to the back of his head. His head injuries, Thompson suggests, were the reason that Spector began his habit of wearing outlandish wigs in later years.

He established the Warner-Spector label with Warner Bros. Records, which undertook new Spector-produced recordings with Cher, Darlene Love, Danny Potter, and Jerri Bo Keno, in addition to several reissues. A similar relationship with Britain's Polydor Records led to the formation of the Phil Spector International label in 1975. When the Cher and Keno singles (the latter's recordings were only issued in Germany) foundered on the charts, Spector released Dion DiMucci's Born to Be with You to little commercial fanfare in 1975; largely produced and recorded by Spector in 1974, it was subsequently disowned by the singer. In the 1990s and 2000s, the album enjoyed a resurgence among the indie rock cognoscenti. The majority of Spector's classic Philles recordings had been out of print in the U.S. since the original label's demise, although Spector had released several Philles Records compilations in Britain. Finally, he released an American compilation of his Philles recordings in 1977, which put most of the better-known Spector hits back into circulation after many years.

Spector began to reemerge later in the decade, producing and co-writing a controversial 1977 album by Leonard Cohen, titled Death of a Ladies' Man. This angered many devout Cohen fans who preferred his stark acoustic sound to the orchestral and choral wall of sound that the album contains. The recording was fraught with difficulty. After Cohen had laid down practice vocal tracks, Spector mixed the album in studio sessions, rather than allowing Cohen to take a role in the mixing, as Cohen had previously done. Cohen remarked that the result is "grotesque", but also "semi-virtuous"—for many years, he included a reworked version of the track "Memories" in live concerts. Bob Dylan and Allen Ginsberg also participated in the background vocals on "Don't Go Home with Your Hard-On".

Spector also produced the much-publicized Ramones album End of the Century in 1979. As with his work with Leonard Cohen, End of the Century received criticism from Ramones fans who were angered over its radio-friendly sound. However, it contains some of the best known and most successful Ramones singles, such as "Rock 'n' Roll High School", "Do You Remember Rock 'n' Roll Radio?", and their cover of a previously released Spector song for the Ronettes, "Baby, I Love You".{{refn|group=nb|The band still name-checked Spector in the song "It's Not My Place (in the 9 to 5 World)" on their next album, 'Pleasant Dreams.}} Guitarist Johnny Ramone later commented on working with Spector on the recording of the album, "It really worked when he got to a slower song like "Danny Says"—the production really worked tremendously. For the harder stuff, it didn't work as well."

Rumors circulated for years that Spector had threatened members of the Ramones with a gun during the sessions. Dee Dee Ramone claimed that Spector once pulled a gun on him when he tried to leave a session. Drummer Marky Ramone recalled in 2008, "They [guns] were there but he had a license to carry. He never held us hostage. We could have left at any time."

1981–2003: Inactivity

Spector remained inactive throughout most of the 1980s, 1990s, and early 2000s. In early 1981, shortly after the death of John Lennon, he temporarily re-emerged to co-produce Yoko Ono's Season of Glass.In 1989, Tina Turner inducted Spector into the Rock and Roll Hall of Fame as a non-performer. Rolling Stone reported, "Spector hit the stage bopping madly to the strains of the Ronettes' "Be My Baby", flanked by three beefy bodyguards who practically elbowed Tina out of the way. He mumbled a few incoherent words about George H. W. Bush and the presidential inauguration, and then his bodyguards carried him away again." He was inducted into the Songwriters Hall of Fame in 1997 and he received the Grammy Trustees Award in 2000.

In 1994, Spector wrote a letter to the Rock and Roll Hall of Fame's nominating committee to oppose the Ronettes being considered for induction. He argued that the group was not a proper recording act and did not contribute enough to music to merit an induction. The Ronettes were eventually inducted into the Hall, but not until 2007.

He attempted to work with Céline Dion on her album Falling into You but fell out with her production team. His last released project was Silence Is Easy by Starsailor, in 2003. He was originally supposed to produce the entire album, but was fired owing to personal and creative differences. One of the two Spector-produced songs on the album, the title track, was a UK top 10 single (the other single being "White Dove").

 2003–2021: Clarkson murder and imprisonment 

On February 3, 2003, Spector shot actress Lana Clarkson in the mouth while in his mansion (the Pyrenees Castle) in Alhambra, California. Her body was found slumped in a chair with a single gunshot wound to her mouth. Spector told Esquire in July 2003 that Clarkson's death was an "accidental suicide" and that she "kissed the gun". The emergency call from Spector's home, made by Spector's driver, Adriano de Souza, quotes Spector as saying, "I think I killed somebody." De Souza added that he saw Spector come out of the back door of the house with a gun in his hand.

Spector remained free on $1 million bail while awaiting trial. In the meantime, Spector produced singer-songwriter Hargo Khalsa's track (known professionally as Hargo) "Crying for John Lennon", which originally appears on Hargo's 2006 album In Your Eyes. On a visit to Spector's mansion for an interview for the Lennon tribute film Strawberry Fields, Hargo played Spector the song and asked him to produce it.

On March 19, 2007, Spector's murder trial began. Presiding Judge Larry Paul Fidler allowed the proceedings in Los Angeles Superior Court to be televised. On September 26, Fidler declared a mistrial because of a hung jury (ten to two for conviction).

Released in December 2007, the song "B Boy Baby" by Mutya Buena and Amy Winehouse featured melodic and lyrical passages heavily influenced by "Be My Baby". As a result, Spector was given a songwriting credit on the single. The sections from "Be My Baby" were sung by Winehouse, not sampled from the mono single. Winehouse referenced her admiration of Spector's work and often performed Spector's first hit song, "To Know Him Is to Love Him". That same month, Spector attended the funeral of Ike Turner. In his eulogy, Spector criticized Tina Turner's autobiography—and its subsequent promotion by Oprah Winfrey—as a "badly written" book that "demonized and vilified Ike". Spector commented that "Ike made Tina the jewel she was. When I went to see Ike play at the Cinegrill in the '90s ... there were at least five Tina Turners on the stage performing that night, any one of them could have been Tina Turner."

In mid-April 2008, BBC Two broadcast a special titled Phil Spector: The Agony and the Ecstasy, by Vikram Jayanti. It consists of Spector's first screen interview—breaking a long period of media silence. During the conversation, images from the murder court case are juxtaposed with live appearances of his tracks on television programs from the 1960s and 1970s, along with subtitles giving critical interpretations of some of his song production values. While he does not directly try to clear his name, the court case proceedings shown try to give further explanation of the facts surrounding the murder charges leveled against him. He also speaks about the musical instincts that led him to create some of his most enduring hit records, from "You've Lost That Lovin' Feelin'" to "River Deep, Mountain High", as well as Let It Be, along with criticisms he feels he has had to deal with throughout his life.

The retrial of Spector for murder in the second degree began on October 20, 2008, with Judge Fidler again presiding; the retrial was not televised. Spector was once again represented by attorney Jennifer Lee Barringer. The case went to the jury on March 26, 2009, and 18 days later, on April 13, the jury returned a guilty verdict. Additionally, Spector was found guilty of using a firearm in the commission of a crime, which added four years to the sentence. He was immediately taken into custody and, on May 29, 2009, was sentenced to 19 years to life in the California state prison system. Various attempted appeals were unsuccessful, in 2011, 2012, and 2016.

 Musicianship 

Spector's early musical influences included Latin music in general, and Latin percussion in particular. This is perceptible in many if not all of Spector's recordings, from the percussion in many of his hit songs: shakers, güiros (gourds), and maracas in "Be My Baby" and the son montuno in "You've Lost That Lovin' Feeling" (heard clearly in the song's bridge, played by session bassist Carol Kaye, while the same repeating refrain is played on harpsichord by Larry Knechtel).

Spector's trademark during his recording career was the so-called Wall of Sound, a production technique yielding a dense, layered effect that reproduced well on AM radio and jukeboxes. To attain this signature sound, Spector gathered large groups of musicians (playing some instruments not generally used for ensemble playing, such as electric and acoustic guitars) playing orchestrated parts—often doubling and tripling many instruments playing in unison—for a fuller sound. Spector himself called his technique "a Wagnerian approach to rock & roll: little symphonies for the kids".

Spector directed the overall sound of his recordings, using a core group that became known as the Wrecking Crew, including session players such as Hal Blaine, Larry Knechtel, Steve Douglas, Carol Kaye, Roy Caton, Glen Campbell, and Leon Russell. He delegated arrangements to Jack Nitzsche and had Sonny Bono oversee the performances, viewing these two as his "lieutenants". Spector frequently used songs from songwriters employed at the Brill Building (Trio Music) and at 1650 Broadway (Aldon Music), such as the teams of Ellie Greenwich and Jeff Barry, Barry Mann and Cynthia Weil, and Gerry Goffin and Carole King. He often worked with the songwriters, receiving co-credit and publishing royalties for compositions.

Despite the trend towards multichannel recording, Spector was vehemently opposed to stereo releases, saying that it took control of the record's sound away from the producer in favor of the listener. Sometimes a pair of strings or horns would be double-tracked multiple times to sound like an entire string or horn section. But in the final product the background sometimes could not be distinguished as either horns or strings. Spector also greatly preferred singles to albums, describing LPs as "two hits and ten pieces of junk", reflecting both his commercial methods and those of many other producers at the time. 

Legacy and influence
According to guitarist Stevie Van Zandt of the E Street Band, Spector was a "genius irredeemably conflicted". On Twitter, he wrote: "[Spector] was the ultimate example of the art always being better than the artist... [He] made some of the greatest records in history based on the salvation of love while remaining incapable of giving or receiving love his whole life."

Spector is often called the first auteur among musical artists for acting not only as a producer, but also the creative director, writing or choosing the material, supervising the arrangements, conducting the vocalists and session musicians, and masterminding all phases of the recording process. He helped pave the way for art rock, and helped inspire the emergence of aesthetically oriented genres such as shoegaze and noise music. PopMatters editor John Bergstrom credits the start of dream pop to Spector's collaboration with George Harrison on All Things Must Pass.

His influence has been claimed by performers such as the Beatles, the Beach Boys, and the Velvet Underground alongside latter-day record producers such as Brian Eno and Tony Visconti. Alternative rock performers Cocteau Twins, My Bloody Valentine, and the Jesus and Mary Chain have all cited Spector as an influence. Shoegaze, a British musical movement in the late 1980s to mid-1990s, was heavily influenced by the Wall of Sound. Jason Pierce of Spiritualized has cited Spector as a major influence on his Let It Come Down album. Bobby Gillespie of Primal Scream and the Jesus and Mary Chain has enthused about Spector, with the song "Just Like Honey" opening with an homage of the famous "Be My Baby" drum intro.

Many have tried to emulate Spector's methods, and Brian Wilson of the Beach Boys—a fellow adherent of mono recording—considered Spector his main competition as a studio artist. In the 1960s, Wilson thought of Spector as "the single most influential producer. He's timeless. He makes a milestone whenever he goes into the studio." Wilson's fascination with Spector's work has persisted for decades, with many different references to Spector and his work scattered around Wilson's songs with the Beach Boys and even his solo career. Of Spector-related productions, Wilson has been involved with covers of "Be My Baby", "Chapel of Love", "Just Once in My Life", "There's No Other (Like My Baby)", "Then He Kissed Me", "Talk to Me", "Why Don't They Let Us Fall in Love", "You've Lost That Lovin' Feelin'", "Da Doo Ron Ron", "I Can Hear Music", and "This Could Be the Night".

Johnny Franz's mid-1960s productions for Dusty Springfield and the Walker Brothers also employed a layered, symphonic "Wall of Sound" arrangement-and-recording style, heavily influenced by the Spector sound. Another example is the Forum, a studio project of Les Baxter, which produced a minor hit in 1967 with "The River Is Wide". Sonny Bono, a former associate of Spector's, developed a jangly, guitar-laden variation on the Spector sound, which is heard mainly in mid-1960s productions for his then-wife Cher, notably "Bang Bang (My Baby Shot Me Down)".

Bruce Springsteen emulated the Wall of Sound technique in his recording of "Born to Run". In 1973, the British band Wizzard, led by Roy Wood, had three Spector-influenced hits with "See My Baby Jive", "Angel Fingers (A Teen Ballad)", and "I Wish It Could Be Christmas Everyday", the latter becoming a perennial Christmas hit. Other contemporaries influenced by Spector include George Morton, Sonny & Cher, the Rolling Stones, the Four Tops, Mark Wirtz, the Lovin' Spoonful, and the Beatles. Swedish pop group ABBA cited Spector as an influence, and used similar Wall of Sound techniques in their early songs, including "Ring Ring", "Waterloo", and "Dancing Queen". The Los Angeles-based new wave band Wall of Voodoo takes their name from Spector's Wall of Sound. Spector's influence is also felt in other areas of the world, especially Japan. City pop musician Eiichi Ohtaki has been influenced by Spector and the Wall of Sound.

 Personal life 
Relationships and children
Spector's first marriage was in 1963 to Annette Merar, lead vocalist of the Spectors Three, a 1960s pop trio formed and produced by Spector. Spector named a record company after Merar, Annette Records. Spector and Merar divorced in 1966. While still married to Merar, he began having an affair with Ronnie Bennett, later known as Ronnie Spector. Bennett was the lead singer of the girl group the Ronettes (another group Spector managed and produced). They married in 1968 and adopted a son, Donté Phillip Spector. As a Christmas present, Spector surprised her by adopting twins Louis Phillip Spector and Gary Phillip Spector.

In her 1990 memoir, Be My Baby: How I Survived Mascara, Miniskirts And Madness, Bennett alleged that Spector had imprisoned her in his California mansion and subjected her to years of psychological torment. According to Bennett, Spector sabotaged her career by forbidding her to perform. She escaped from the mansion barefoot with the help of her mother in 1972. In their 1974 divorce settlement, she forfeited all future record earnings and surrendered custody of their children. She alleged that this was because Spector threatened to hire a hitman to kill her.

Spector's sons Gary and Donté both stated that their father "kept them captive" as children, and that they were "forced to perform simulated intercourse" with his girlfriend. According to Gary, "I was blindfolded and sexually molested. Dad would say, 'You're going to meet someone,' and it would be a 'learning experience'." Donté described himself as coming "from a very sick, twisted, dysfunctional family".

In 1982, Spector had twin children with his girlfriend Janis Zavala: Nicole Audrey Spector and Phillip Spector Jr. Phillip Jr. died of leukemia in 1991. On September 1, 2006, while on bail and awaiting trial, Spector married his third wife Rachelle Short, who was 26 at the time. Spector filed for divorce in April 2016, claiming irreconcilable differences. They divorced in 2018.

Health, illness, and death

Spector testified in a 2005 court deposition that he had been treated for bipolar disorder ("manic depression") for eight years, saying, "No sleep, depression, mood changes, mood swings, hard to live with, hard to concentrate, just hard—a hard time getting through life, I've been called a genius and I think a genius is not there all the time and has borderline insanity."

In the first criminal trial for the Clarkson murder, defense expert and forensic pathologist Vincent DiMaio said that Spector might be suffering from Parkinson's disease stating, "Look at Mr. Spector. He has Parkinson's features. He trembles."

California Department of Corrections photos from 2013 (released in September 2014) show evidence of a progressive deterioration in Spector's health, according to observers.Phil Spector photos show prison taking its toll  The Times. Retrieved September 24, 2014. He had been an inmate at the California Health Care Facility (a prison hospital) in Stockton since October 2013. In September 2014, it was reported that Spector had lost his ability to speak, owing to laryngeal papillomatosis.

He was taken to San Joaquin General Hospital in French Camp, California, on December 31, and intubated in January 2021. Spector died in an outside hospital on January 16 at the age of 81, according to the California Department of Corrections and Rehabilitation. Spector's daughter Nicole attributed her father's death to complications of COVID-19, with which he was diagnosed in December 2020. He would have been eligible for parole in 2024.

Some media outlets that reported on Spector's death were subject to controversy for reportedly downplaying his murder conviction. Examples given were the obituaries in The New York Times and Rolling Stone, which originally stated, respectively, that Spector's  legacy "was marred by a murder conviction" and that his "life was upended" after being sentenced. These obituaries were revised following a social media backlash.

In popular culture
 I Dream of Jeannie (1967, "Jeannie, the Hip Hippie" – season 3, episode 6): Phil Spector made a cameo as himself. Jeannie decides she wants to be a pop star and enlists Spector for help. Though referred to by the characters throughout the episode as "Phil Spector", the credit roll lists "Phil Spector as 'Steve Davis.
 Beyond the Valley of the Dolls (1970): The character of Ronnie "Z-Man" Barzell is based upon Spector, though neither Russ Meyer nor screenwriter Roger Ebert had met him.
 Phantom of the Paradise (1974): The villainous character Swan (played by Paul Williams) was supposedly inspired by Spector. A music producer and head of a record label, Swan was named "Spectre" in original drafts of the film's screenplay.
 What's Love Got to Do with It (1993): Spector is portrayed by Rob LaBelle.
 Grace of My Heart (1996): The film contains many characters based upon 1960s musicians, writers and producers including the character Joel Milner played by John Turturro (based on Spector).
 In the docudrama And the Beat Goes On: The Sonny and Cher Story, Phil Spector is portrayed by Christian Leffler.
 Metalocalypse (2006–2013): The character Dick Knubbler is a parody of Spector, based on profession, appearance and record of assault.
 A Reasonable Man (2009): Harv Stevens is reportedly based on Spector. The film examines his relationship with John Lennon.
 Phil Spector (2013): Spector is portrayed by Al Pacino.
 Love & Mercy (2014): Spector is portrayed by Jonathan Slavin. However, his scene was cut from the theatrical release.
  He was also in Easy Rider as a drug dealer.
 The song "Christmas Kids" by ROAR references Spector's relationship with Ronnie

 Discography 

 Awards 

Spector is one of a handful of producers to have number one records in three consecutive decades (1950s, 1960s and 1970s). Others in this group include Quincy Jones (1960s, 1970s, and 1980s), George Martin (1960s, 1970s, 1980s, and 1990s), Michael Omartian (1970s, 1980s and 1990s),Jimmy Jam and Terry Lewis (1980s, 1990s, and 2000s), and Max Martin (1990s, 2000, 2010s, and 2020s).Whitburn, Joel (2013). Joel Whitburn's Top Pop Singles 1955–2012. Record Research (14th ed.).

 Awards and nominations 

 Rankings 

 Notes 

References

Bibliography

 
 
 
 
 
 
 
 
 
 
 
 
 
 

Further reading
 Baker, James Robert. Fuel-Injected Dreams New York: E.P. Dutton ; novel whose central character is reportedly based on Spector
 Emerson, Ken. Always Magic in the Air: The Bomp and Brilliance of the Brill Building Era New York: Viking Press 
 Wolfe, Tom. "The First Tycoon of Teen"magazine article reprinted in Wolfe, The Kandy-Kolored Tangerine-Flake Streamline Baby, ; and in Back to Mono'' liner notes

External links

 
 
 
 
Please Phil Spector, artists that have included references to Spector in their own works

 
1939 births
2021 deaths
21st-century American criminals
Age controversies
American businesspeople convicted of crimes
American entertainment industry businesspeople
American male criminals
American people convicted of murder
American people of Russian-Jewish descent
American people who died in prison custody
Apple Records
Criminals from Los Angeles
Criminals from New York City
Deaths from the COVID-19 pandemic in California
Domestic violence in the United States
Fairfax High School (Los Angeles) alumni
Grammy Award winners
Jewish American songwriters
Male murderers
Musicians from the Bronx
People convicted of murder by California
People from Alhambra, California
People with bipolar disorder
Plastic Ono Band members
Record producers from California
Record producers from New York (state)
Songwriters from New York (state)
The Wrecking Crew (music) members
Prisoners who died in California detention
The Teddy Bears members
Prisoners who died from COVID-19